Antonio Tublén is a Swedish director and screenwriter. He debuted in 2004 with the short film Hollywood. It was followed by Havanna (2005) and The Amazing Death of Mrs Müller (2006), which he co-directed with Alexander Brøndsted. His first feature film was Original, produced for Zentropa in 2009. It won the Golden Goblet for best film at the 2009 Shanghai International Film Festival.  His second feature was LFO, which premiered at the 2013 Fantastic Fest.

Filmography 
2009 Original – Writer-Director
2013 LFO – Writer-Director
2018 Zoo – Writer-Director

Reception
Todd Brown, writing for fantasticfest.com called LFO "A clever, totally lo-fi science fiction dramedy" and said that it "delights in a good idea executed well." He further said that " Tublen's script showcases the same dry wit that made his debut a hit on the international festival circuit while his gifted ensemble delivers quality performances across the board."

References

External links 
 
 

Living people
Swedish film directors
Year of birth missing (living people)